Andrei Ursache (born 10 May 1984) is a Romanian rugby union player. He plays in the prop position for amateur Pro D2 club Carcassonne and formally for București based European Challenge Cup side the Wolves. Ursache also plays for Romania's national team the Oaks.

He is the older brother of fellow rugby union player Valentin Ursache.

References

External links

1984 births
Living people
Romanian rugby union players
Romania international rugby union players
Rugby union props
People from Bacău County
US Carcassonne players